The 6th FINA Synchronised Swimming World Cup was held July 7–10, 1993 in Lausanne, Switzerland. It featured swimmers from 11 nations, swimming in three events: Solo, Duet and Team.

Participating nations
11 nations swam at the 1993 Synchro World Cup:

Results

Point standings

References

FINA Synchronized Swimming World Cup
1993 in synchronized swimming
International aquatics competitions hosted by Switzerland
1993 in Swiss sport
Synchronised swimming in Switzerland